The Heart of Chicago 1967–1998 Volume II is the sixth greatest hits album, and twenty-fourth album overall, by American rock band Chicago, released in 1998. As the sequel to 1997's The Heart of Chicago 1967–1997, this edition also features a mixture of songs from Chicago's entire 30-year career to date.

As with the first edition, The Heart of Chicago 1967–1998 Volume II is noted for containing two exclusive new songs. "All Roads Lead to You" and "Show Me a Sign" were both produced by Roy Bittan of Bruce Springsteen's E Street Band.

Released in May 1998, The Heart of Chicago 1967–1998 Volume II was not as successful as its predecessor, peaking only at #154 in the US. Both editions of The Heart of Chicago are comparable to Rhino Records' 2002 two-CD package The Very Best of Chicago: Only the Beginning.

Reception
The Heart of Chicago 1967–1998 Volume II (Reprise 46911) reached No. 154 in the US albums chart during a chart stay of 2 weeks.

Track listing
"Dialogue (Part I & II)" (Robert Lamm) – 7:10 
"Old Days" (James Pankow) – 3:30 
"All Roads Lead to You" (Marc Beeson/Desmond Child) – 4:20 
 A new recording
"Love Me Tomorrow" (Peter Cetera/David Foster) – 4:59 
"Baby, What a Big Surprise" (Cetera) – 3:06 
"You're Not Alone" (Jim Scott) – 3:57 
"What Kind of Man Would I Be?" (Jason Scheff/Chas Sandford/Bobby Caldwell) – 4:19 
"No Tell Lover" (Cetera/Lee Loughnane/Danny Seraphine) – 3:49  (This version is slightly different than the album version)
"Show Me a Sign" (Pankow/Greg O'Connor) – 3:37 
 A new recording
"(I've Been) Searchin' So Long" (Pankow) – 4:29 
"Call on Me" (Lee Loughnane) – 4:02 
"I Don't Wanna Live Without Your Love" (Diane Warren/Albert Hammond) – 3:57 
"Feelin' Stronger Every Day" (Cetera/Pankow) – 4:13 
"Stay the Night" (Cetera/Foster) – 3:46 
"I'm a Man" (Jimmy Miller/Steve Winwood) – 7:39 
"25 or 6 to 4" (Lamm) – 4:50

References

Albums produced by James William Guercio
Albums produced by Phil Ramone
Albums produced by David Foster
Albums produced by Roy Bittan
Albums produced by Ron Nevison
1998 greatest hits albums
Chicago (band) compilation albums
Reprise Records compilation albums